Trevoria is a genus of orchids native to southeastern Central America and northwestern South America. It grows in intermediate temperature and is found from Nicaragua and Costa Rica to Bolivia.

Trevoria was described by FC Lehmann in 1897. A photo of this single plant is also in the new vol 6 of the book Native Colombian Orchids: Volume 6: Supplement: Leucohyle-Zootrophion (1998).  The name is in honor of Sir Trevor Lawrence a specialist in orchids who at the time maintained one of the finest collections of orchids in England at his home Burford Lodge, in Surrey, and a former president of The Royal Horticultural Society.

Species
Species recognized as of June 2014:

Trevoria chloris Lehm. - Colombia
Trevoria escobariana Garay - Colombia, Ecuador
Trevoria glumacea Garay - Costa Rica, Nicaragua
Trevoria lehmannii Rolfe - Colombia, Ecuador
Trevoria zahlbruckneriana (Schltr.) Garay - Costa Rica, Nicaragua, Ecuador, Bolivia

References

External links
Trevoria chloris
IOSPE photo, Trevoria chloris F. Lehm. 1897 Photo courtesy of Hans-Gerhardt Seeger

Stanhopeinae genera
Stanhopeinae